Ayka is a 2018 drama film directed by Sergey Dvortsevoy. It was selected to compete for the Palme d'Or at the 2018 Cannes Film Festival. At Cannes, Samal Yeslyamova won the award for Best Actress. It was selected as the Kazakhstani entry for the Best Foreign Language Film at the 91st Academy Awards, making the December shortlist. The film was produced under the working title My Little One.

Plot
The story is centered around a young Kyrgyz woman named Ayka who lives in Moscow, Russia. After giving birth to a baby, she abandons the newborn, escaping through a hospital window. She is desperate for income, as she owes money to criminals but now struggles to repay the debt. She returns to a job plucking chicken feathers. After the work is done, the men running the operation leave without paying their workers. Trying to regain another previous job, Ayka finds that she has been permanently replaced while in labor. With her work permit expired and pain and complications from the pregnancy, it is nearly impossible for her to find or keep another employment. Ayka finally gets a part-time job as a cleaner at the veterinary clinic.

Debt collectors find her and demand she return their money, threatening to torture her sister back in Kyrgyzstan. She confesses to them about the recent birth of a son, saying that she became pregnant as a result of rape. They offer to take her child in order to settle her debts.

Cast
 Samal Yeslyamova as Ayka
 Polina Severnaya as the hospital administrator
 Andrey Kolyadov as Victor, the chief

Reception

Critical response

Awards and nominations

See also
 List of submissions to the 91st Academy Awards for Best Foreign Language Film
 List of Kazakhstani submissions for the Academy Award for Best Foreign Language Film

Notes

References

External links

2018 drama films
2018 films
2010s Russian-language films
Kyrgyz-language films
Kazakhstani drama films
Russian drama films
French drama films
German drama films
Polish drama films
Chinese drama films
Films about illegal immigration
Films set in Moscow
2010s French films
2010s German films